The Liuzhou–Wuzhou Railway (Chinese: 柳梧铁路) is a Chinese rail line. It connects Liuzhou City of the Liujiang District, to Wuzhou. It cost 19.6 billion yuan ($3.2 billion), including a capital fund of 9.8 billion yuan with a four year completion schedule.

During testing, the project aimed to improve capacity, ease existing congestion, and encourage construction and development of Guangxi, which connects the Greater Bay Area of Guangdong–Hong Kong–Macao.

A major station of the railway network in the Guangdong–Hong Kong–Macao Greater Bay Area. The project is owned and initiated by the Liunan Railway Corporation.

Route 
The line passes through ten stations; two overpass stations and eight intermediate stations. From Jinde Station it crosses Quannan Expressway to the southeast through Chuanshan Town and Shilong Town. Traveling on the west side of the expressway, it passes through the north side of Huangmao Township, to Wuxuan Station in the north of Ertang Town. After leaving the Wuxuan station, the line runs southeast, reaching Dongxiang Station on the north side of Dongxiang. Then the line enters the Scenic Area of Guiping Xishan, passing through Zijing Town and the north side of Jintian Town. Going towards the northeast, the line crosses Wangwu Station on the south side of Wangwu Village, then crossing the Baomao Expressway while turning to the northeast.

References 

Railway lines in China
Rail transport in Guangxi